Justice is the twelfth studio album by American southern rock band Molly Hatchet, released in 2010 (see 2010 in music).

Track listing

Personnel 
Molly Hatchet
Phil McCormack – lead vocals
Bobby Ingram – guitars, acoustic guitar, backing vocals, producer, mixing
Dave Hlubek – guitars
John Galvin – keyboards, organ, programming
Tim Lindsey – bass, backing vocals
Shawn Beamer – drums, percussion

Additional musicians
Tina Lux, Michael Bormann, Anke Renner, Abigail Thompson – backing vocals

Production
Tommy Newton – engineer, mixing, mastering
John Bettis, Scott Fravala, Daryl Pheeneger, Claus Kramer – engineers

References

Molly Hatchet albums
2010 albums
SPV/Steamhammer albums